Anant Ram (born 21 October 1932) is an Indian gymnast. He competed iat the 1956 Summer Olympics and the 1964 Summer Olympics.

References

1932 births
Living people
Indian male artistic gymnasts
Olympic gymnasts of India
Gymnasts at the 1956 Summer Olympics
Gymnasts at the 1964 Summer Olympics
Sportspeople from Himachal Pradesh